The Stari Han is a former caravanserai in Kosjerić, Zlatibor District, Serbia. It was built in Ottoman style by Antonije Radojević in 1854 to serve travelers along the road from Dubrovnik to Belgrade. In 2019, ten million dinars were granted to renovate the building, which has been under state protection since the 1980s as a cultural monument.

Gallery

See also
Architecture of Serbia

References

Caravanserais in the Balkans
19th-century establishments in Serbia
Užice